Henry Bayly-Paget, 1st Earl of Uxbridge (18 June 1744 – 13 March 1812), known as Henry Bayly until 1769 and as Lord Paget between 1769 and 1784, was a British peer.

Early life
Born Henry Bayly, Uxbridge was the eldest son of Sir Nicholas Bayly, 2nd Baronet, of Plas Newydd in Anglesey, by his wife Caroline Paget, daughter of Brigadier-General Thomas Paget and a great-granddaughter of William Paget, 5th Baron Paget. He succeeded as 10th Baron Paget in 1769 on the death of his mother's second cousin, Henry Paget, 2nd Earl of Uxbridge. By Royal Licence on 29 January 1770, he took the name of Paget in lieu of Bayly. In 1782 he succeeded his father as 3rd Baronet.

Career
Paget was commissioned Colonel of the newly raised Staffordshire Militia on 22 April 1776 during the War of American Independence. He resigned in 1781 but was re-appointed in 1783, after the war had ended and the regiment was disembodied. He was still commanding the regiment when it was re-embodied for the French Revolutionary War, and remained so until his death.

Uxbridge became Lord Lieutenant of Anglesey in 1782. On 19 May 1784, he was created Earl of Uxbridge, in the County of Middlesex. He was also Lord Lieutenant of Staffordshire between 1801 and 1812, Constable of Caernarfon Castle, Ranger of the Forest of Snowdon, Steward of Bardney, and Vice-Admiral of North Wales.

Personal life

In 1767 Lord Uxbridge married Jane, daughter of the Very Reverend Arthur Champagné, Dean of Clonmacnoise, a descendant of a well-known Huguenot family which had settled in Ireland, and his wife Jane Forbes. They had twelve children:

 Field Marshal Henry William Paget, 1st Marquess of Anglesey (1768–1854), who married Lady Caroline Villiers, a daughter of George Villiers, 4th Earl of Jersey. They divorced in 1810 and she married George Campbell, 6th Duke of Argyll.
 Captain William Paget (1769–1794), an MP who died unmarried.
 Sir Arthur Paget (1771–1840), who married Lady Augusta Parker, the daughter of John Fane, 10th Earl of Westmorland and former wife of John Parker, 1st Earl of Morley, in 1809.
 Lady Caroline Paget (1773–1847), who married John Capell, a son of William Capell, 4th Earl of Essex.
 Lady Jane Paget (1774–1842), who married George Stewart, 8th Earl of Galloway.
 General Sir Edward Paget (1775–1849), who married Frances Bagot, third daughter of William Bagot, 1st Baron Bagot and Elizabeth St John (eldest daughter of John St John, 2nd Viscount St John), in 1805. After her death in 1806, he married Lady Harriet Legge, third daughter of George Legge, 3rd Earl of Dartmouth.
 Lady Louisa Paget (1777–1842), who married, firstly, Lt.-Gen. Sir James Erskine, Bt.; and, secondly, Gen. Sir George Murray.
 Vice-Admiral Sir Charles Paget (1778–1839), who married Elizabeth Monck, daughter and co-heiress of Henry Monck, in 1805.
 Berkeley Thomas Paget (1780–1842), who married Sophia Bucknall, only surviving child of William Bucknall, (second son of James Grimston, 2nd Viscount Grimston), in 1804.
 Lady Charlotte Paget (1781–1817), who married John Cole, 2nd Earl of Enniskillen.
 Lady Mary Paget (1783–1835), who married Thomas Graves, 2nd Baron Graves.
 Brownlow Paget (1787–1797), who died young.

Lord Uxbridge died in March 1812, aged sixty-seven, and was succeeded in the earldom by his eldest son Henry, who gained fame at the Battle of Waterloo and was created Marquess of Anglesey. The Countess of Uxbridge died in March 1817, aged seventy.

In 1809 Lord Uxbridge bought Surbiton Place, just to the south of Kingston upon Thames. When the Surbiton Park estate was built on its grounds in the 1850s, a street was named Uxbridge Road in honour of him and his heir Henry, who inherited it.

References

External links
 

|-

|-

|-

1744 births
1812 deaths
Earls of Uxbridge
Lord-Lieutenants of Anglesey
Lord-Lieutenants of Staffordshire
Staffordshire Militia officers
Henry